Laugheryville is an unincorporated community in Laughery Township, Ripley County, in the U.S. state of Indiana.

History
Laugheryville was platted in 1847.

Geography

References

Unincorporated communities in Ripley County, Indiana
Unincorporated communities in Indiana